Heap's algorithm generates all possible permutations of   objects. It was first proposed by B. R. Heap in 1963. The algorithm minimizes movement: it generates each permutation from the previous one by interchanging a single pair of elements; the other  elements are not disturbed. In a 1977 review of permutation-generating algorithms, Robert Sedgewick concluded that it was at that time the most effective algorithm for generating permutations by computer.

The sequence of permutations of  objects generated by Heap's algorithm is the beginning of the sequence of permutations of  objects. So there is one infinite sequence of permutations generated by Heap's algorithm .

Details of the algorithm 
For a collection  containing  different elements, Heap found a systematic method for choosing at each step a pair of elements to switch in order to produce every possible permutation of these elements exactly once.

Described recursively as a decrease and conquer method, Heap's algorithm operates at each step on the  initial elements of the collection. Initially  and thereafter . Each step generates the  permutations that end with the same  final elements. It does this by calling itself once with the  element unaltered and then  times with the  element exchanged for each of the initial  elements. The recursive calls modify the initial  elements and a rule is needed at each iteration to select which will be exchanged with the last. Heap's method says that this choice can be made by the parity of the number of elements operated on at this step. If  is even, then the final element is iteratively exchanged with each element index. If  is odd, the final element is always exchanged with the first.

procedure generate(k : integer, A : array of any):
    if k = 1 then
        output(A)
    else
        // Generate permutations with k-th unaltered
        // Initially k = length(A)
        generate(k - 1, A)

        // Generate permutations for k-th swapped with each k-1 initial
        for i := 0; i < k-1; i += 1 do
            // Swap choice dependent on parity of k (even or odd)
            if k is even then
                swap(A[i], A[k-1]) // zero-indexed, the k-th is at k-1
            else
                swap(A[0], A[k-1])
            end if
            generate(k - 1, A)
        end for
    end if

One can also write the algorithm in a non-recursive format.

procedure generate(n : integer, A : array of any):
    // c is an encoding of the stack state. c[k] encodes the for-loop counter for when generate(k - 1, A) is called
    c : array of int

    for i := 0; i < n; i += 1 do
        c[i] := 0
    end for

    output(A)
    
    // i acts similarly to a stack pointer
    i := 1;
    while i < n do
        if  c[i] < i then
            if i is even then
                swap(A[0], A[i])
            else
                swap(A[c[i]], A[i])
            end if
            output(A)
            // Swap has occurred ending the for-loop. Simulate the increment of the for-loop counter
            c[i] += 1
            // Simulate recursive call reaching the base case by bringing the pointer to the base case analog in the array
            i := 1
        else
            // Calling generate(i+1, A) has ended as the for-loop terminated. Reset the state and simulate popping the stack by incrementing the pointer.
            c[i] := 0
            i += 1
        end if
    end while

Proof
In this proof, we'll use the implementation below as Heap's Algorithm. While it is not optimal (see section below), the implementation is nevertheless still correct and will produce all permutations. The reason for using the below implementation is that the analysis is easier, and certain patterns can be easily illustrated.
procedure generate(k : integer, A : array of any):
    if k = 1 then
        output(A)
    else
        for i := 0; i < k; i += 1 do
            generate(k - 1, A)
            if k is even then
                swap(A[i], A[k-1])
            else
                swap(A[0], A[k-1])
            end if

        end for
    end if

Claim: If array  has length , then performing Heap's algorithm will either result in  being "rotated" to the right by 1 (i.e. each element is shifted to the right with the last element occupying the first position) or result in  being unaltered, depending if  is even or odd, respectively.

We will then need to handle two cases for :  is even or odd.

By swapping the 1st and last element, then swapping 2nd and last, all the way until the th and last elements are swapped, the array will at last experience a rotation. To illustrate the above, look below for the case 
1,2,3,4 ... Original Array
1,2,3,4 ... 1st iteration (Permute subset)
4,2,3,1 ... 1st iteration (Swap 1st element into "buffer")
4,2,3,1 ... 2nd iteration (Permute subset)
4,1,3,2 ... 2nd iteration (Swap 2nd element into "buffer")
4,1,3,2 ... 3rd iteration (Permute subset)
4,1,2,3 ... 3rd iteration (Swap 3rd element into "buffer")
4,1,2,3 ... 4th iteration (Permute subset)
4,1,2,3 ... 4th iteration (Swap 4th element into "buffer") ... The altered array is a rotated version of the original

By the induction hypothesis, it is assumed that the first  elements will rotate. After this rotation, the first element of  will be swapped into the buffer which, when combined with the previous rotation operation, will in essence perform a rotation on the array. Perform this rotation operation  times, and the array will revert to its original state. This is illustrated below for the case .
1,2,3,4,5 ... Original Array
4,1,2,3,5 ... 1st iteration (Permute subset/Rotate subset)
5,1,2,3,4 ... 1st iteration (Swap)
3,5,1,2,4 ... 2nd iteration (Permute subset/Rotate subset)
4,5,1,2,3 ... 2nd iteration (Swap)
2,4,5,1,3 ... 3rd iteration (Permute subset/Rotate subset)
3,4,5,1,2 ... 3rd iteration (Swap)
1,3,4,5,2 ... 4th iteration (Permute subset/Rotate subset)
2,3,4,5,1 ... 4th iteration (Swap)
5,2,3,4,1 ... 5th iteration (Permute subset/Rotate subset)
1,2,3,4,5 ... 5th iteration (Swap) ... The final state of the array is in the same order as the original

The induction proof for the claim is now complete, which will now lead to why Heap's Algorithm creates all permutations of array . Once again we will prove by induction the correctness of Heap's Algorithm.

Induction: Assume Heap's Algorithm permutes an array of size . Using the results from the previous proof, every element of  will be in the "buffer" once when the first  elements are permuted. Because each iteration of Heap's Algorithm has a different element of  occupying the buffer when the subarray is permuted, every permutation is generated as each element of  has a chance to be tacked onto the permutations of the array  without the buffer element.

Frequent mis-implementations
It is tempting to simplify the recursive version given above by reducing the instances of recursive calls. For example, as:

procedure generate(k : integer, A : array of any):
    if k = 1 then
        output(A)
    else

        // Recursively call once for each k
        for i := 0; i < k; i += 1 do
            generate(k - 1, A)
            // swap choice dependent on parity of k (even or odd)
            if k is even then
                // no-op when i == k-1
                swap(A[i], A[k-1])
            else
                // XXX incorrect additional swap when i==k-1
                swap(A[0], A[k-1]) 
            end if

        end for
    end if

This implementation will succeed in producing all permutations but does not minimize movement. As the recursive call-stacks unwind, it results in additional swaps at each level.

These additional swaps significantly alter the order of the  prefix elements.

procedure generate(k : integer, A : array of any):
    if k = 1 then
        output(A)
    else

        // Recursively call once for each k
        for i := 0; i < k; i += 1 do
            generate(k - 1, A)
            // avoid swap when i==k-1
            if (i < k - 1)
                // swap choice dependent on parity of k
                if k is even then
                    swap(A[i], A[k-1])
                else
                    swap(A[0], A[k-1])
                end if
            end if
        end for
    end if

The choice is primarily aesthetic but the latter results in checking the value of  twice as often.

See also
 Steinhaus–Johnson–Trotter algorithm

References

Combinatorial algorithms
Permutations